Stephen Rochefontaine (born Étienne Nicolas Marie Béchet, Sieur de Rochefontaine; February 20, 1755 – January 30, 1814) was a French-born American military engineer who served as the Commandant of the Corps of Artillerists and Engineers from 1795 to 1798.

Military career
Born in Aÿ, France, Rochefontaine came to America in 1778 after failing to gain a position in the French Royal Corps of Engineers. He volunteered in General Washington's Continental Army on May 15, 1778 and was appointed captain in the Corps of Engineers on September 18, 1778. For his distinguished services at the siege of Yorktown, Rochefontaine was given the brevet rank of major by Congress, November 16, 1781.

He returned to France in 1783 and served as an infantry officer, reaching the rank of colonel in the French Army.   He came back to the United States in 1792 and anglicized his first name to Stephen. President Washington appointed him a civilian engineer to fortify the New England coast, in 1794.

After the new Corps of Artillerists and Engineers was organized, Washington made Rochefontaine a lieutenant colonel and commandant of the new Corps on February 26, 1795. Rochefontaine started a military school at West Point in 1795, but the building and all his equipment were burned the following year. He left the United States Army on May 7, 1798, and lived in New York City, where he died January 30, 1814. He is buried in the churchyard of St. Paul's Chapel in New York.

References
This article contains public domain text from

External links

 
 
 

1755 births
1814 deaths
American military engineers
Continental Army officers from France
Burials at St. Paul's Chapel
French emigrants to the United States
People from Marne (department)
United States Army Corps of Engineers Chiefs of Engineers